Jennifer L. Mnookin is an American legal scholar and academic leader, serving as chancellor of the University of Wisconsin–Madison since 2022. A leading expert on the law of evidence and forensic science, she previously served as Dean of the UCLA School of Law, where she was David G. Price and Dallas P. Price Professor of Law. While at UCLA Law, she co-founded and co-directed the Program on Understanding Law, Science and Evidence (PULSE@UCLA Law). From 1998 to 2005, Mnookin was on the faculty of the University of Virginia School of Law, with one year (2002-03) spent as a visiting professor at Harvard Law School. She joined the faculty of UCLA Law in 2005, where she then served as vice dean for faculty and research from 2007–09, vice dean for external appointments and intellectual life from 2012–13, and dean from 2013-2022. On April 23, 2020, she was elected to the American Academy of Arts and Sciences. On May 16, 2022, the University of Wisconsin System Board of Regents announced they had unanimously chosen Mnookin to be the 30th chancellor of the University of Wisconsin–Madison. She took office on August 4, 2022.

Early life and education 

Born in 1967 in Cambridge, Massachusetts, Jennifer Mnookin is the daughter of Dale Mnookin and Robert Mnookin, the Samuel Williston Professor of Law at Harvard Law School. She grew up in Berkeley and Palo Alto, California. For college she returned to Cambridge, Massachusetts to attend Harvard College, where she became an editor for The Harvard Crimson and earned her A.B. in 1988. She received her J.D. from Yale Law School in 1995 and a Ph.D. in the history and sociology of science and technology from the Massachusetts Institute of Technology in 1999.

Career 

Her scholarship focuses on the interconnections between evidence, science and technology, and legal and cultural ideas about proof and persuasion. She has written on topics ranging from the history of photographic evidence to the complexities of the Confrontation Clause of the Sixth Amendment with respect to expert evidence. She is a co-author of The New Wigmore, A Treatise on Evidence: Expert Evidence. Much of her work has focused on the problems of forensic science evidence, especially pattern identification evidence like latent fingerprint identification. She has frequently commented to the press on forensic science and evidence issues and has occasionally consulted or served as an expert witness on the scientific foundation of fingerprint evidence.

Her research on forensic science was cited extensively by the National Academy of Sciences' 2009 report. She is a former member of the National Academy of Science's Committee on Science, Technology and the Law and is on the advisory board of the Electronic Privacy Information Center. She was the primary investigator for a National Institute of Justice project that sought to develop objective metrics for measuring the difficulty of fingerprint comparisons. Her work on the Confrontation Clause was cited and discussed by the Supreme Court of the United States in Williams v. Illinois (2012). In 2016, she co-chaired an advisory group to the President's Council of Advisors on Science and Technology, which issued a report on the reliability of forensic science used in the courtroom.

In her role as a law school administrator, Mnookin is a former member of the steering committee of the Association of American Law Schools' Dean's Forum. Mnookin was named a member of the American Law Institute, a leading organization dedicated to improving and modernizing the law, in 2011.

Personal life 

Mnookin is married to Joshua Foa Dienstag, a professor of political science and law at UCLA. They have two children, Sophia and Isaac.

References 

1967 births
Living people
American legal scholars
American legal writers
Harvard College alumni
The Harvard Crimson people
Leaders of the University of Wisconsin-Madison
Legal educators
Massachusetts Institute of Technology alumni
People from Greater Los Angeles
UCLA School of Law faculty
Yale Law School alumni